Budameru is a rivulet in Krishna district which originates in the hills surrounding Mylavaram and empties itself into Kolleru Lake. Budameru is also known as The Sorrow of Vijayawada. In order to control the floods, the river was dammed at Velagaleru village and a diversion channel named, Budameru Diversion Channel (BDC) was constructed from Velagaleru to join Krishna River upstream of Prakasam Barrage.

This is the first water diversion to the main Krishna river from another river basin. The diversion channel has 10,500 cusecs flow capacity. This diversion channel is made part of Polavaram right bank canal at its tail end. However its flow capacity is to be enhanced to 17,500 cusecs to match with the design capacity of  Polavaram right bank canal. Some water from Polavaram right bank canal can be fed to Eluru canal of Krishna delta by allowing the water to flow in the Budemeru river and connecting the river by gravity to the canal as river is passing by the side of this canal in Vijayawada city (refer 'Google Earth' geographic maps). Thus water can be transferred directly to Prakasam barrage pond via Eluru canal.

Hydro power station feasibility
A hydro power plant of 25 MW capacity can be installed by routing Polavaram Right bank canal water to Prakasam barrage via existing Eluru canal. Polavaram Right bank canal is approaching the outskirts of Vijayawada city at 33 m MSL along the hill slopes located north of Ambapuram village. This point is only 7 km north of Prakasam Barrage but the canal takes another 30 km detour to get connected to the Prakasam barrage pond near Ibrahimpatnam town. The existing Eluru canal from Prakasam barrage was dug across the elevated ridge/doab (where Vijayawada city is located) to cross the Krishna river basin and supply water in to lower Budameru river basin. This canal while crossing the city is a deep cut canal (maximum water level below local ground level). Eluru deep cut canal portion (first 3 km length) can be safely used to feed water (reversing water flow direction) in to Prakasam barrage pond  (full pond level at 17.35 m MSL) by connecting Polavaram Right bank canal with the canal after Ayodhya Nagar. A hydraulic drop of nearly 11 meters is available when the Polavaram right bank canal is connected to the canal which would generate 25 MW Hydro power at 10,000 cusecs flow. No land acquisition in Vijawawada city is required as the tail race canal is routed along the Budameru stream to connect to the existing canal.

Interstate water sharing
As per the inter state agreements  dated 4 August 1978 (page 89) and 29 January 1979 (page 101) with Andhra Pradesh, Karnataka and Maharashtra are entitled to use 21 tmcft and 14 tmcft respectively out of the 80 tmcft water transferred by Polavaram right bank canal from Polavaram reservoir to Prakasam barrage pond across Krishna river. If the Prakasam barrage east delta water requirements (Water supplied by Eluru, Pamarru and Bander canals) are met directly from the Polavaram right bank canal bypassing Prakasam barrage pond/Krishna main river, this water would not be accounted under the 80 tmc which is to be shared with Karnataka and Maharashtra. Thus more Godavari water could be made available for use from the Prakasam barrage by connecting Polavaram right bank canal with Eluru canal via Budameru river.

References 

Water bodies of Andhra Pradesh
Geography of Vijayawada